Giuseppe Lamberti (born 12 November 1973) is an Italian coxswain.

Lamberti was born in 1973. He won bronze at the 1988 World Rowing Junior Championships in Milan with the junior men's coxed four. He won a gold medal at the 1989 World Rowing Championships in Bled with the lightweight men's eight.

References

1973 births
Living people
Italian male rowers
World Rowing Championships medalists for Italy
Coxswains (rowing)